Jetbook may refer to:
 ECTACO jetBook, a line of eBook readers
 A line of notebook computers by Jetta